Ichnomancy (from ichno- "track, footstep" + -mancy "method of divination") is the divination of a person's qualities (e.g., posture, position) or character (i.e., personality) by means of footprints or other such human-made tracks.

References

See also
 Divination
 Methods of divination
 Foot pressure
 Gait analysis

Divination
Foot